Shubraveshti Ramaswamiah Seetharama Sharma (1 December 1933 – 5 June 1985), known popularly as S. R. Puttanna Kanagal, was an Indian filmmaker known for his work in Kannada cinema. He is often considered one of Kannada cinema's most influential filmmakers.

Background and personal life
Puttanna Kanagal was born to Ramaswamaiah and Subbamma in Kanagal, a village in the erstwhile Kingdom of Mysore into a poor family. As he hailed from a poor brahmin family, he had to endure hardships and struggled to get a decent job. He worked as a teacher, salesman and even as a cleaner. His job as a publicity boy brought him closer to theatre and subsequently to cinema. His association with films began when he started working for B. R. Panthulu as an assistant director and also as his driver. His first film as an assistant director was Rathnagiri Rahasya (1957).

Puttanna married Nagalakshmi at very young age and they had 5 children. However he fell in love with his protege and leading actress in 1970s Aarathi and they got married during 1976–77. They had a daughter Yashaswini, who was born in 1978. However, due to creative differences Puttanna and Aarathi separated in 1981.

In 1981 Puttanna's magnum opus Ranganayaki did not do as well as expected at the box office, even though it gained critical acclaim and later went on to become a cult classic. In addition to this, separation from Aarathi had impacted his health. He had no work in hand for 14 months starting from late 1980 to mid of 1982. Srinath whom Puttanna directed in blockbuster films like Shubhamangala and Dharmasere came to his help, and they made Maanasa Sarovara which became an average hit and helped Puttanna bounce back. His later films like Amruta Ghalige and Runamukthalu did reasonably well. Kanagal died on 5 June 1985 in Bengaluru while shooting Masanada Hoovu.

Starting his career as a publicity boy, Kanagal was drawn into independent filmmaking after a stint in theatre and working with film director and producer B. R. Panthulu as his assistant. Kanagal's assistants include Tamil directors S. P. Muthuraman, Bharathiraja, and T. S. Nagabharana.

Although a majority of Kanagal's films were on offbeat or taboo subjects, generally women-centric, he endeared himself to both the critics and ordinary film goers alike making "bridge films" between art and commercial cinema. His film in Kannada, Gejje Pooje, based on a novel of the same name by M. K. Indira is considered a landmark film. He would go on to direct other films such as Kappu Bilupu (1969), Sharapanjara (1971), Naagarahaavu (1972), Edakallu Guddada Mele (1973), Shubhamangala (1975) and Ranganayaki (1981), all of which are seen as milestones in Kannada cinema. He also directed a handful of films in Malayalam, Tamil Telugu and Hindi languages.

As a director 
Often credited as a movie-maker much ahead of his times, his first directorial venture was the 1964 Malayalam movie  School Master, a remake of his mentor B. R. Panthulu's Kannada classic of the same name.  He then directed another Malayalam movie Poochakkanni (Cat eyed/Hazel eyed lady) based on the Kannada novel Bekkina Kannu by Triveni. Puttanna's first Kannada film as a director was Bellimoda (Silver Cloud) in 1967. Starring Kalpana and Kalyan Kumar, this movie was a critical and commercial success. Legend has it that Puttanna scouted for a week to find the perfect location for the mellifluous song mooDala maneyaa. Belli Moda is credited as the first Kannada movie to be shot exclusively outdoors. He directed many masterpieces like Gejje Pooje, Sharapanjara, Naagarahaavu etc.  '. His last film was Savira Mettilu, which never released during his lifetime.

He also provided a platform for many actors such as Kalpana, Aarathi, Leelavathi, Jayanthi, Padma Vasanthi, Srinath, Rajinikanth, Vishnuvardhan, Ambareesh, Jai Jagadish, Chandra Shekhar, Gangadhar, Shivaram, Vajramuni, Sridhar, Ramakrishna and Aparna to showcase their talents.

In devotion to Puttanna, Dr.Vishnuvardhan said,  "Puttanna Kanagal Sir was the God-sent teacher for me!  And I have been made an actor. I am indebted to guru Puttanaji. He used to conceptualize scenes, narrate them to me, inspire me and extract the potential till then unknown to myself. Acting in a single movie under Puttanna's expertise is an experience of a lifetime."

Puttanna introduced most of the actors in the Kannada film industry. Tamil director Bharathiraja worked under him. Each of Kanagal's 24 Kannada movies had strong themes filled with unprecedented direction.

Tamil legendary film maker K. Balachander, winner of the 2010 Dadasaheb Phalke Award had great regard for Puttanna. In many of his interviews to the media, Balachandar has stated that he considered a much younger, Puttanna Kanagal, a director from Kannada(Karnataka) film industry to be his guru in film making. An excerpt from one such interview:

Q) You have stated in many interviews that you consider Puttanna Kanagal (Kannada filmmaker), though younger than you, as your guru in filmmaking. What is it that you learnt from him?

A) Age has got nothing to do with learning. You can learn from anybody and everybody. I liked and admired Puttanna Kanagal, because, at the time when many of our filmmakers lacked the vision of filmmaking in terms of visuals he was the one who insisted on films being visual than oral. Apart from that his ability to churn out the human emotions from his actors was one of his kind.

In fact Balachander, for most of the remakes of his Tamil films in Kannada (Benkiyalli Aralida Hoo, Mauna Geethe) has gone on to cast many of the talents like Ashwath, Sridhar, Jai Jagadesh, Ramakrishna, Srinath, nurtured in Puttanna's camp. Also, both Puttanna's and Balachander's films dealt with the issues on women – more so in Puttanna's films.

The Visualiser 
The Kannada film industry in the 1960s and the 1970s started moving from mythological and historical subjects to socially relevant themes. This metamorphosis was reflected in the rise of bandaaya sahitya or rebellious literature. The New Wave Cinema or Alternate Cinema movement spread across India, particularly in Karnataka, West Bengal and Kerala. Puttanna's movies, however, were seen as a bridge between commercial cinema and alternate cinema. While his plots, based on popular Kannada novels, revolved around strong characters and distinct themes, he added mandatory songs and emotions to distinguish from alternate cinemas. His mastery over symbolism is quite remarkable. He has effectively used effectively in almost all of his movies.

Puttanna was also considered as a pioneer in picturising songs. In general, his movies contained 4–5 songs. Even with respect to song picturisation, Puttanna had a strong sense of colour and imagery. He would go to great lengths to select the locations and costumes for a song. The songs generally reflected the inherent mood of the film. For instance, the song from the movie Manasasarovara, Neene saakida gini, a poignant song, was shot amidst the dust-filled mining areas, thereby reflecting the agony of a man who has lost his true love. Similarly the song sandesha megha sandesha from the movie Sharapanjara was shot in the Madikeri, with innumerable oranges strewn around.

He was well known for his effective use of freeze shots and negative images to heighten the introspective effect of key scenes. Although his films were accused of being too woman-centric, Puttanna personally felt that such notions were wrong.

He was the first director of the Kannada Film Directors Association after its inception in 1984.
Poonam Theatre in Jayanagar, Bangalore was renamed in his honor after his last film debuted there. In 2004, the theatre closed until reopening after a 2011 campaign supported by Baraguru Ramachandrappa, V. Manohar and the Democratic Youth Federation of India and was scheduled for demolition in July 2012 but later saved and remodeled. In June 2015, the 30th anniversary of his death was honored with an event organized by the Karnataka Chalanachitra Academy and guests and speakers included Ambareesh, Leelavathi, S. Shivaram, Jai Jagadish, Ashok, K. S. L. Swamy and Rajendra Singh Babu.

Awards and honours
Kanagal received three National Film Awards, three Filmfare Awards South and multiple Karnataka State Film Awards. Karnataka state honours film directors and various personalities with Puttanna Kanagal Award in his memory every year during the Karnataka State Awards function.

List of awards and honours

Filmfare Awards South

National Film Awards

Karnataka State Film Awards

Filmography

References

External links
 

1933 births
1985 deaths
Hindi-language film directors
20th-century Indian film directors
Kannada film directors
Writers from Mysore
Kannada screenwriters
Filmfare Awards South winners
Businesspeople from Mysore
Film producers from Karnataka
Film directors from Karnataka
Artists from Mysore
20th-century Indian dramatists and playwrights
Kannada film cinematographers
20th-century Indian photographers
Cinematographers from Karnataka
Screenwriters from Karnataka
Best Original Screenplay National Film Award winners
20th-century Indian screenwriters